Aleksei Sergeyevich Shelyakov (born 30 March 1995) is a Russian football player.

Club career
He made his professional debut in the Russian Professional Football League for FC Metallurg Vyksa on 12 July 2014 in a game against FC Fakel Voronezh.

He made his Russian Football National League debut for FC Volga Nizhny Novgorod on 31 August 2015 in a game against FC KAMAZ Naberezhnye Chelny.

References

External links
 

1995 births
Sportspeople from Nizhny Novgorod
Living people
Russian footballers
Association football forwards
FC Volga Nizhny Novgorod players
FC Dynamo Stavropol players
FC Nizhny Novgorod (2015) players
FC Khimik Dzerzhinsk players